Supreme Chaos is the seventh album by American Christian metalcore band War of Ages, released through Facedown Records July 22, 2014. War of Ages worked with Joshua Barber on the production of the album.

Reception

Signaling in a four star review by HM Magazine, Reid Olson responds, "The guitar riffs rip, the drumming drives and altogether, Supreme Chaos causes barely controlled headbanging. A definite add to the War of Ages canon." Danny McMartin, indicating in an eight out of ten review from Cross Rhythms, regarding, "It is this deft approach which makes 'Supreme Chaos' such a pleasing effort." Specifying in a four and a half star review from Jesus Freak Hideout, Aaron Lambert replies, "Overall, War of Ages have unleashed a metal masterpiece with Supreme Chaos. There's no disputing that this is the best album they have ever written, and with the addition of the brilliant Jack Daniels to the already stellar lineup, this could mark the beginning of a new chapter for one of Christian metal's most gifted prodigies. Supreme Chaos comes highly recommended." Lee Brown writes in a four star review from Indie Vision Music, recognizing, "Though they are always one of the strongest bands out there, Supreme Chaos brings an even more polished and spiritually uplifting set of songs to War of Ages’ already impressive arsenal."

Track listing

Personnel

War of Ages
 Leroy Hamp – vocals
 Steve Brown – guitar
 Jack Daniels – guitar, guitar engineer
 Ryan Tidwell - bass, clean vocals
 Alex Hamp – drums, percussion

Additional musicians
 Tyler Lyon – vocals
 Nick Marshall – vocals

Production
 Zach Alvey – assistant engineer
 Joshua Barber – engineer, producer
 McKinney Botts – assistant engineer
 Jason Dunn – A&R
 Will Putney – mastering, mixing
 Dave Quiggle – art direction, design, illustrations
 Ben "Bob" Turkovic – assistant engineer

Charts

References

2014 albums
War of Ages albums
Facedown Records albums